Marrowbone Creek is a stream in the U.S. state of West Virginia.

Marrowbone Creek was named for an incident when hungry pioneers near the creek ate bone marrow from a buffalo carcass.

See also
List of rivers of West Virginia

References

Rivers of Mingo County, West Virginia
Rivers of Wayne County, West Virginia
Rivers of West Virginia